Erhard Eduard Wechselmann (1895–1943) was a German baritone who was murdered in Auschwitz concentration camp.

According to Peter Hugh Reed writing in American Record Guide, 1949, he also sang with the Metropolitan Opera in 1890.
Under the Nazi regime, Wechselmann performed for Jewish audiences, on at least one occasion with the contralto Ottilie Metzger-Lattermann who was also to perish in Auschwitz.

References

German people who died in Auschwitz concentration camp
1895 births
1943 deaths
German operatic baritones
Jewish opera singers
20th-century German male opera singers
German Jews who died in the Holocaust